"That's What My Love Is For" is a song written by Amy Sky and Dave Pickell and performed by Anne Murray and Aaron Neville.  The song reached #15 on the Canadian Adult Contemporary chart in 1996. The song appeared on her 1996 album, Anne Murray.

Charts

References

1996 singles
Anne Murray songs
Aaron Neville songs
Arista Records singles
1996 songs